All Mod Cons is the third studio album by the British band The Jam, released in 1978 by Polydor Records. The title, a British idiom one might find in housing advertisements, is short for "all modern conveniences" and is a pun on the band's association with the mod revival. The album reached No. 6 in the UK Albums Chart.

The album was reissued in the United States in 1979, with the song "The Butterfly Collector" replacing "Billy Hunt".

Background and music

Following the release of their second album, This Is the Modern World, the Jam undertook a 1978 tour of the US supporting American rock band Blue Öyster Cult. The Jam were not well received on the tour and This Is the Modern World failed to reach the Billboard 200 chart. Under pressure from their record company, Polydor, to deliver a hit record, songwriter Paul Weller was suffering from writer's block when the band returned to the UK. Weller admitted to a lack of interest during the writing/recording process, and had to completely re-record a new set of songs for the album after producer Chris Parry rejected the first batch as being sub-standard. All Mod Cons was more commercially successful than This Is the Modern World.

British Invasion pop influences run through the album, most obviously in the cover of The Kinks' "David Watts". The single "Down in the Tube Station at Midnight", which Weller had originally discarded because he was unhappy with the song's arrangement, was rescued from the studio bin by producer Vic Coppersmith and became one of the band's most successful chart hits up to that point, peaking at number 15 on the UK Singles Chart. The song is a first-person narrative of a young man who walks into a tube station on the way home to his wife, and is beaten by far right thugs. The lyrics of the song "To Be Someone (Didn't We Have a Nice Time)" criticised fickle people who attach themselves to people who enjoy success and leave them once that is over.

"Class issues were very important to me at that time ..." said Weller. "Woking has a bit of a stockbroker belt on its outskirts. So I had those images – people catching the train to Waterloo to go to the city. 'Mr Clean' was my view of that."

All Mod Cons was reissued on CD in 2006, featuring a second disc of b-sides, outtakes and unreleased demos and a DVD containing a 40-minute documentary directed by Don Letts.

Reception

In his review for NME, Charles Shaar Murray said that All Mod Cons was "not only several light years ahead of anything they've done before but also the album that's going to catapult the Jam right into the front rank of international rock and roll; one of the handful of truly essential rock albums of the last few years." Sounds critic Garry Bushell hailed it as the Jam's "statement of artistic triumph, musical maturation and compositional strength". Dave Schulps of Trouser Press stated that "All Mod Cons firmly establishes Paul Weller (and the Jam) as a major talent (and band) for the '80s."

NME ranked All Mod Cons as the second best album of 1978 in its end of year review.

In 2000, Q placed All Mod Cons at number 50 on its list of the "100 Greatest British Albums Ever". In 2013, NME ranked All Mod Cons at number 219 on its list of the 500 greatest albums of all time. The album is listed in the reference book 1001 Albums You Must Hear Before You Die.

Track listing
All songs written by Paul Weller except as noted.

Side one
 "All Mod Cons" – 1:20
 "To Be Someone (Didn't We Have a Nice Time)" – 2:32
 "Mr. Clean"* – 3:29
 "David Watts" (Ray Davies) – 2:56
 "English Rose"** – 2:51
 "In the Crowd" – 5:40

Side two
 "Billy Hunt" – 3:01 [UK and 1st US pressings] "The Butterfly Collector" – 3:11 [US reissues]
 "It's Too Bad" – 2:39
 "Fly" – 3:22
 "The Place I Love" – 2:54
 "'A' Bomb in Wardour Street" – 2:37
 "Down in the Tube Station at Midnight" – 4:43

**Neither the title nor lyrics of "English Rose" were printed on the original vinyl release of All Mod Cons due to Weller's feeling that the song's lyrics didn't mean much without the music behind them.

Personnel
The Jam
Paul Weller – guitar, piano, keyboard, vocals
Bruce Foxton – bass, vocals
Rick Buckler – drums, percussion
Technical
Vic Coppersmith-Heaven – production, soundboard engineering
Chris Parry – associate production
Roger Béchirian – soundboard engineering
Gregg Jackman – soundboard engineering
Peter Schierwade – assistant engineering
Phil Thornalley – assistant engineering
Bill Smith – design
The Jam – design
Peter "Kodick" Gravelle – photography

Charts

Certifications

References

External links

Album online on Radio3Net a radio channel of Romanian Radio Broadcasting Company

1978 albums
Albums recorded at RAK Studios
Polydor Records albums
The Jam albums